Stothert may refer to:
 Stothert’s & Sons Ltd, a former Chemists, Pharmaceuticals and Soft Drinks manufacturer
 James Stothert, former English footballer
 Jean Stothert, mayor-elect of Omaha, Nebraska, USA
 Stothert & Pitt, a former British engineering company

See also
Stothert, Slaughter & Co, locomotive manufacturer in Bristol, England between 1864 and 1934
Stothert & Pitt RFC, a men's rugby union football club
Stothard (surname page)